The Culture of Iraq (Arabic: ثقافة العراق) or The Culture of Mesopotamia is one of the world's oldest cultural histories and is considered one of the most influential cultures in the world. The region between the Tigris and Euphrates rivers, historically known as Mesopotamia, is often referred to as the Cradle of civilisation.  Mesopotamian legacy went on to influence and shape the civilizations of the Old World in different ways such as inventing writing system, mathematics, law, astrology and many more. Iraq is home to diverse ethnic groups who have contributed to the wide spectrum of the Iraqi Culture. The country is known for its poets، architects، painters and sculptors who are among the best in the region, some of them being world-class. The country has one of the longest written traditions in the world including architecture, literature, music, dance, painting, weaving, pottery, calligraphy, stonemasonry and metalworking.

Additionally, Iraq embraces and celebrates the achievements of its past in pre-Islamic times as well as in Islamic times during Islamic Golden Age when Baghdad was the capital of the Abbasid Caliphate.

Art 

Iraq's art has a deep heritage that extends back in time to ancient times and refers to all works of visual art originating from the geographical region since ancient Mesopotamian periods. Mesopotamian art include favourite subjects such as deities, either alone or with worshippers, and animals in several types of scenes: repeated in rows, single, fighting each other or a human, confronted animals by themselves or flanking a human or god in the Master of Animals motif, or a Tree of Life.

During the Abbasid Caliphate, which ruled from the heartland of Mesopotamia, pottery achieved a high level of sophistication, calligraphy began to be used to decorate the surface of decorative objects and illuminated manuscripts, particularly Q'ranic texts became more complex and stylised. Iraq's first art school was established during this period, allowing artisans and crafts to flourish. Famous Abbasid artist include Yahya Al-Wasiti whi lived in Baghdad in the late Abbasid era (12th to 13th-centuries) and was the pre-eminent artist of the Baghdad school. His most well-known works include the illustrations for the book of the Maqamat (Assemblies) in 1237, a series of anecdotes of social satire written by al-Hariri. Al-Waiti's illustrations served as an inspiration for the 20th-century modern Baghdad art movement.

Languages 
The main languages spoken in Iraq are Mesopotamian Arabic and Kurdish, followed by the Iraqi Turkmen/Turkoman dialect of Turkish, and the Neo-Aramaic languages (specifically Chaldean and Assyrian). Arabic and Kurdish are written with versions of the Arabic script. Since 2005, the Turkmen/Turkoman have switched from the Arabic script to the Turkish alphabet.

In addition, the Neo-Aramaic languages use the Syriac script. Other smaller minority languages include Mandaic, English, Shabaki and Armenian.

According to the Constitution of Iraq (Article 4):

 The Arabic language and the Kurdish language are the two official languages of Iraq. The right of Iraqis to educate their children in their mother tongue, such as Turkmen, Syriac, and Armenian shall be guaranteed in government educational institutions in accordance with educational guidelines, or in any other language in private educational institutions.

Ancient 
Sumerian (𒅴𒂠 EME.G̃IR15 "native tongue") was the language of ancient Sumer and a language isolate that was spoken in Mesopotamia (Iraq). The Sumerian language is the earliest known written language. The "proto-literate" period of Sumerian writing spans c. 3300 to 3000 BC. In this period, records are purely logographic, with phonological content. The oldest document of the proto-literate period is the Kish tablet. Falkenstein (1936) lists 939 signs used in the proto-literate period (late Uruk, 34th to 31st centuries).
During the 3rd millennium BC, an intimate cultural symbiosis developed between the Sumerians and the Semitic-speaking Akkadians, which included widespread bilingualism. The influence of Sumerian and the East Semitic language Akkadian on each other is evident in all areas, from lexical borrowing on a substantial scale to syntactic, morphological, and phonological convergence. This has prompted scholars to refer to Sumerian and Akkadian in the third millennium BC as a Sprachbund.

Literature

Pre-Islamic 
Sumerian literature constitutes the earliest known corpus of recorded literature, including the religious writings and other traditional stories maintained by the Sumerian civilization and largely preserved by the later Akkadian and Babylonian empires. These records were written in the Sumerian language during the Middle Bronze Age.

The Sumerians invented one of the first writing systems, developing Sumerian cuneiform writing out of earlier proto-writing systems by about the 30th century BC. The Sumerian language remained in official and literary use in the Akkadian and Babylonian empires, even after the spoken language disappeared from the population; literacy was widespread, and the Sumerian texts that students copied heavily influenced later Babylonian literature.

Poetry 
Poetry is the most dominant form of literature in Iraq and the country is known for having notable poets.

An ancient Mesopotamian poem gives the first known story of the invention of writing:Because the messenger's mouth was heavy and he couldn't repeat [the message], the Lord of Kulaba patted some clay and put words on it, like a tablet. Until then, there had been no putting words on clay.

— Sumerian epic poem Enmerkar and the Lord of Aratta. Circa 1800 BCGilgamesh (Sumerian: 𒀭𒄑𒉋𒂵𒈨𒌋𒌋𒌋, romanized: Gilgameš; originally Sumerian: 𒀭𒉋𒂵𒈩, romanized: Bilgamesh) was a major hero in ancient Mesopotamian mythology and the protagonist of the Epic of Gilgamesh.

The Epic of Gilgamesh (/ˈɡɪlɡəmɛʃ/) is an epic poem from ancient Mesopotamia, regarded as the earliest surviving notable literature. The literary history of Gilgamesh begins with five Sumerian poems about Bilgamesh (Sumerian for "Gilgamesh"), king of Uruk, dating from the Third Dynasty of Ur (c. 2100 BCE). These independent stories were later used as source material for a combined epic in Akkadian. The first surviving version of this combined epic, known as the "Old Babylonian" version dates to the 18th century BCE and is titled after its incipit, Shūtur eli sharrī ("Surpassing All Other Kings"). Only a few tablets of it have survived. The later Standard Babylonian version compiled by Sîn-lēqi-unninni dates from the 13th to the 10th centuries BCE and bears the incipit Sha naqba īmuru("He who Saw the Abyss", in modern terms: "He who Sees the Unknown"). Approximately two-thirds of this longer, twelve-tablet version have been recovered. Some of the best copies were discovered in the library ruins of the 7th-century BC Assyrian king Ashurbanipal.

Post-Islamic 
During the Abbasid Caliphate, the well established tradition of poetry continued to be the most dominant form of literature. In addition, Abbasid literature was characterized by the emergence of many new genres and of a scholarly and sophisticated critical consciousness.

Baghdad evolved into a significant cultural, commercial, and intellectual center of the Muslim world. This, in addition to housing several key academic institutions, including the House of Wisdom, as well as hosting a multiethnic and multireligious environment, garnered the city a worldwide reputation as the "Centre of Learning".

Contemporary 
Some of the most important figures of 20th century Iraqi literature include, Safa Khulusi Maruf Rusafi and Daisy Al-Amir, Jamil Zahawi, Jawahiri and Khazal al Majidi.

Architecture

The ancient architecture of Mesopotamia, encompassing several distinct cultures and spanning a period from the 10th millennium BC, when the first permanent structures were built in the 6th century BC. Among the Mesopotamian architectural accomplishments are the development of urban planning, the courtyard house, and ziggurats. No architectural profession existed in Mesopotamia; however, scribes drafted and managed construction for the government, nobility, or royalty. The local architecture of Iraq was often based on vernacular architecture inherited from one generation to the next. Since the Iraqi society is composed of multicultural social groups with different architectural heritage, therefore, old Iraqi cities have several types architecture and urban forms.

Iraq is known for having world-class architects, such as Zaha Hadid, Rifat Chadirji and Hisham N. Ashkouri among others.

Cinema 
While Iraq's first film projection took place in 1909, cinema was not truly regarded as a cultural activity or pastime until the 1920s. The first cinemas, like the famous al-Zawra cinema on Baghdad's bustling thoroughfare al-Rashid, played mostly American silent films for British citizens. In the 1940s under the rule of King Faisal II of Iraq, a real Iraqi cinema began. Supported by British and French financiers, movie production companies established themselves in Baghdad. The Baghdad Studio was established in 1948, but soon came apart when tensions between the Arab and Jewish founders flared up. For the most part, the product was purely commercial, fluffy romances with plenty of singing and dancing often set in small villages. The World of Arts (Dunyat Alfann) studio, which was founded by actors, reached for more serious fare. In 1955, they produced Haidar Al-Omar's Fitna wa Hassan, an Iraqi retelling of Romeo and Juliet, that received international attention. But for the most part, the strong-fist rule of the state discouraged any socially relevant films. In 1959 when King Faisel II's government was overthrown, the Cinema and Theater General organization came into existence with the purpose of promoting the political goals of the new regime both in documentaries and features. Typical were documentaries like the 1969 Al Maghishi Project, which showcased the government's irrigation campaigns and the 1967 A Wedding in Heaven, which celebrates the air force and their weapons system. The 1968 revolution that put the Ba'ath party in power further solidified the government's control of film material, and the state's need to make all films validate its power.

Saddam Hussein's ascension to power in 1979 pushed the Iraqi cinema in a slightly different direction. The drain on national resources from the 1980 Iraq-Iran war brought film production to a near halt. The few films put into production were mainly intent on glorifying a mythic Iraqi history or celebrating Hussein's rule. In 1981, the government commissioned Egyptian filmmaker Salah Abouseif to make Al-Qadisiya, a period epic recounting the triumph of the Arabs over the Persians in 636 AD. Likewise Mohamed Shukri Jameel's melodramatic The Great Question (al-Mas' Ala Al-Kubra) cast British actor Oliver Reed as the vicious Lt-Col Gerard Leachman who is righteously killed in the 1920 Iraqi revolution. In 1980 Hussein promoted his own mythology with the autobiographical 6-hour epic The Long Days (al-Ayyam al-tawila), the saga of Hussein's participation in the 1958 failed assassination attempt on Prime Minister Abd al-Karim Qasim, and his subsequent heroic escape back to Tikrit. The film was edited and partially directed by Terence Young, the British director who made his name helming the early James Bond films Dr. No and Thunderball (film). Hussein is played by Saddam Kamel, a cousin and son-in-law of Hussein's, who eventually ran afoul of the dictator and was murdered in 1996. After Iraq invaded Kuwait, sanctions against Iraq made filmmaking an impossibility in the country, although a new generation of filmmakers is coming alive in Baghdad.

Music
Iraq is known primarily for its rich maqam heritage which has been passed down orally by the masters of the maqam in an unbroken chain of transmission,

leading up to the present. The maqam al-Iraqi is considered to be the most noble and perfect form of maqam. Al-maqam al-Iraqi is the collection of sung,

poems written either in one of the sixteen meters of classical Arabic or in Iraqi dialect (Zuhayri).

This Form of art is recognised by UNESCO as "an intangible heritage of humanity".

Sport

Football is the most well known sport in Iraq. The Iraq national football team were the 2007 AFC Asian Cup Champions after defeating Saudi Arabia in the final, held in Jakarta, Indonesia. In 2006, Iraq reached the football final of the 2006 Asian Games in Doha, Qatar, after defeating former FIFA World Cup semi-finalists South Korea and eventually finished as runners-up, winning silver. The football tournament at the 2004 Summer Olympics in Athens, Greece, saw Iraq finish in fourth place, with the Italy national football team claiming bronze from a single goal.

The Iraqi Football Association is the governing body of football in Iraq, controlling the Iraq national football team and the Iraq Super League (also known as Dawri Al-Nokba). It was founded in 1948, and has been a member of FIFA since 1950, and the Asian Football Confederation since 1971.

It was founded in 1948, and has been a member of FIFA since 1950, and the Asian Football Confederation since 1971. Big clubs in Iraq include Al-Shorta, Al-Quwa Al-Jawiya, Al-Zawraa, Erbil SC, Duhok SC, Al Talaba and Najaf FC. Basketball, swimming, weightlifting, bodybuilding, boxing, kickboxing, and tennis are also popular sports.

Cuisine
Iraqi cuisine or Mesopotamian cuisine has a long history going back some 10,000 years – to the Sumerians, Babylonians, Assyrians,

and Ancient Persians. Tablets found in ancient ruins in Iraq show recipes prepared in the temples during religious festivals - the first cookbooks in the world. Ancient Iraq, or Mesopotamia was home to a sophisticated and highly advanced civilization, in all fields of knowledge - including the culinary arts.

However, it was in the Islamic Golden Age when Baghdad was the capital of the Abbasid Caliphate that the Iraqi kitchen reached its zenith. Today, the cuisine of Iraq reflects this rich inheritance, as well as strong influences from the culinary traditions of neighbouring Persia, Turkey, and the Syria region. Some popular dishes include Kebab (often marinated with garlic, lemon, and spices, then grilled), Gauss (grilled meat sandwich wrap, similar to Döner kebab), Bamieh (lamb, okra, and tomato stew), Quzi (lamb with rice, almonds, raisins, and spices),  and salad in pita, Kubbah (minced meat ground with bulghur wheat, or rice and spices), Masgûf (grilled fish with pepper and tamarind), and Maqluba (a rice, lamb, tomato, and aubergine dish). Stuffed vegetable dishes such as Dolma and Mahshi are also popular. Machbous is also a popular dish in the south and south east of Iraq.

Contemporary Iraq reflects the same natural division as ancient Mesopotamia, which consisted of Assyria in the arid northern uplands and Babylonia in the southern alluvial plain. Al-Jazira (the ancient Assyria) grows wheat and crops requiring winter chill such as apples and stone fruits. Al-Irāq (Iraq proper, the ancient Babylonia) grows rice and barley, citrus fruits, and is responsible for Iraq's position as the world's largest producer of dates.

Kitab al-tabikh is the oldest surviving Arabic cookbook, written by al-Warraq in the 10th century. It is compiled from the recipes of the 8th and 9th century courts of the Abbasid Caliphate in Baghdad. Some scholars speculate that al-Warraq may have prepared the manuscript on behalf of a patron, the Hamdanid prince Sayf al-Dawla, who sought to improve the cultural prestige of his own court in Aleppo as the court in Baghdad had started to decline.

Contemporary culture

Cultural heritage
Iraq is a country of a wide and varied heritage, home to religious groups such as  years, wereMuslims, Christians, Jews, Mandaaeans, Yazidis, and ethnic groups such as Arabs, Kurds and Turkmen who have contributed to the wide spectrum of Iraqi Culture. Many markets reflect local culture and economy such as the famous Al-Safafeer market in Baghdad which is one of the oldest markets in the city established during the Abbasid Caliphate and remains famous for various copper collectables and exhibits.

Tea houses are scattered throughout Iraq, and in the afternoon, it is a habit for shopkeepers to retreat into the back with close friends to sip tea over gossip, an Iraqi "siesta".

Cultural institutions

Some important cultural institutions in the capital include the Iraqi National Orchestra (rehearsals and performances were briefly interrupted during the Occupation of Iraq, but have since returned to normal) and the National Theatre of Iraq (the theatre was looted during the 2003 Invasion of Iraq, but efforts are underway to restore the theatre). The live theatre scene received a boost during the 1990s, when UN sanctions limited the import of foreign films. As many as 30 movie theatres were reported to have been converted to live stages, producing a wide range of comedies and dramatic productions.

Institutions offering cultural education in Baghdad include the Academy of Music, Institute of Fine Arts, and the Music and Ballet school Baghdad. Baghdad also features a number of museums including the National Museum of Iraq - which houses the world's largest and finest collection of artifacts and relics of Ancient Iraq civilizations; some of which were stolen during the Iraq War.

Festivals 
Some cultural events are celebrating the Iraqi culture over time. The Iraq's Babylon International Festival is promoting arts including dance and music, hosting thousands of Iraqi visitors. It experienced a break of 19 years, since the American invasion, but was organized again since 2021. The international event founded in 1987, gathers artists coming from all around the world. In 2022 the city of Mosul hosted the festival of traditional music, supported by UNESCO. Organizers of the event expressed their will to perpetuate this festival in the future and to organize an edition each year.

See also 
 Iraqi art
 Arabic miniature 
List of World Heritage Sites in Iraq
 Mesopotamia
List of museums in Iraq
History of Iraq
History of Baghdad
Akkadian Empire
Assyria
Babylonia
Sumer
Abbasid Caliphate
Mesopotamian Cuisine

References

External links
Iraq: Cultural-Historical Zones

 
Iraq